Deutsche Adria-Zeitung was a German-language daily newspaper published from Trieste. The first issue was published on 14 January 1944. The newspaper was published seven times a week and had a weekly supplement called Adria-Illustrierte. Deutsche Adria-Zeitung was discontinued in May 1945.

References

Bibliography
La stampa nazista a Trieste 1944-1945. Trieste: "Italo Svevo", 1995.

1944 establishments in Italy
1945 disestablishments in Italy
Defunct newspapers published in Italy
German-language newspapers published in Europe
Daily newspapers published in Italy
Mass media in Trieste
Publications established in 1944
Publications disestablished in 1945